Daniela Tavalazzi  (born 8 August 1972) is an Italian footballer who played as a defender for the Italy women's national football team. She was part of the team at the UEFA Women's Euro 1997 and 1999 FIFA Women's World Cup.

References

External links
 

1972 births
Living people
Italian women's footballers
Italy women's international footballers
Place of birth missing (living people)
1999 FIFA Women's World Cup players
Women's association football defenders
Torres Calcio Femminile players
A.S.D. AGSM Verona F.C. players
S.S. Lazio Women 2015 players
ACF Milan players
A.S.D. Reggiana Calcio Femminile players
Torino Women A.S.D. players